The Root River is a river in Algoma District in northeastern Ontario, Canada. It flows from Upper Island Lake at the community of Island Lake to its mouth at the St. Marys River.

Course
From Upper Island Lake, the river heads south and parallels Ontario Highway 552 to that highway's beginning at Ontario Highway 17 at the community of Heyden, then Highway 17 to the Odena neighbourhood of Sault Ste. Marie. It then heads east and southeast to reach its mouth at the St. Marys River, which forms a small delta called Bells Point.

Tributaries
Crystal Creek (left)
Coldwater Creek (left)
West Root River (right)

See also
List of rivers of Ontario

References

Rivers of Algoma District